Isaac Moillon (8 July 1614, Paris - 26 May 1673, Paris) was a French Baroque painter of scenes from mythology and the Bible. He also designed tapestries. His work was forgotten after his death, until interest was revived in the 1980s.

Biography
His father, the painter Nicolas Moillon (1555-1619), died when he was only five years old. Shortly after, his mother married another painter, who specialized in still-lifes. His sister, Louise Moillon, would become one of the best known still-life painters of that period. Despite the intense religious situation at that time, both he and his sister remained Protestants.

His first works date from 1634 to 1637. Between 1638 and 1640, he created decorations, mostly of a military nature, in the Hôtel Bautru, an hôtel particulier, under the direction of its architect, Louis Le Vau and the Master Builder Michel Villedo, in the Rue Croix-des-Petits-Champs. It was demolished in 1823 to make way for the new Galerie Vivienne. His fame at the time rested largely on murals depicting Christ as a healer, made at the Hôtel-Dieu de Beaune (now the Hospices de Beaune) in 1646. He was named a member of the Académie royale de peinture et de sculpture in 1655. 

As a painter to the King, he created several designs for tapestries, including a few on the history of Achilles, that were woven at the Aubusson manufactory. Some are kept at the Hospices de Beaune, along with miniatures depicting scenes from the life of Christ. The  in Aubusson has nine pieces on Dido and Aeneas.

References

Further reading 
 Nicole de Reyniès, Sylvain Laveissière, Un peintre du roi à Aubusson, Isaac Moillon 1614-1673, Éditions Somogy, 2005, 335 p., 
 Renaud Benoit-Cattin, "Quelques aspects de l'œuvre du peintre Isaac Moillon (1614-1673)", from In Situ. Revue du patrimoine, #2, 2002 (online)
 Jacques Wilhelm, "Un peintre oublié: Isaac Moillon de l'Académie royale. Ses œuvres à l'hôtel-Dieu de Beaune". in: Bulletin de la Société de l'histoire de l'art français, 1973, pgs. 113–132.

External links 

More works by Moillon @ ArtNet

1614 births
1673 deaths
French artists
French muralists
French tapestry artists
Artists from Paris